Chaba River is a river in the area of Chongqing Municipality, China.

External links
 http://china.org.cn/english/TR-e/38369.htm

Rivers of Chongqing